This Year's Model is the 32nd studio album by Christian music vocal group The Imperials, released in 1987 on Myrrh Records. This is the first album to feature new members Jimmie Lee Sloas and Ron Hemby, replacing long-time tenor Jim Murray and lead singer Paul Smith. It was a change in direction as This Year's Models sound was more rock-oriented alienating long-time fans of the Imperials' four-part harmony of their early years. The track "Power of God" became a theme song for Christian bodybuilders the Power Team and new younger fans began to come to Imperials concerts. Production duties were done by Brown Bannister, who produced their previous album Let the Wind Blow (1985) with songwriting contributions from fellow CCM acts Pam Mark Hall, Chris Eaton and Paul Smith who co-wrote the lead single "Wings of Love". This Year's Model peaked at number 3 on the Billboard Top Inspirational Albums chart.

Track listing

 Personnel The Imperials Jimmie Lee Sloas – tenor, co-lead vocals
 Ron Hemby – tenor, co-lead vocals
 David Will – baritone, vocals
 Armond Morales – bass, vocalsMusicians Peter Kaye – Fairlight programming
 Steve Schaffer – Synclavier programming
 Keith Thomas – keyboards (1, 2, 5, 8, 9), drum programming (1, 2, 5), rhythm track arrangements (1, 2, 5), additional keyboards (6)
 Shane Keister – Fairlight programming, additional keyboards (1), additional bass (1), keyboards (4, 7, 8), drums (4), drum programming (7), rhythm track arrangements (7) 
 Carl Marsh – Fairlight programming, Fairlight III (1, 3)
 Chris Eaton – keyboards (3), drum programming (3)
 Rhett Lawrence – Fairlight programming, keyboards (6), drum programming (6), rhythm track arrangements (6)
 Robbie Buchanan – acoustic piano (9)
 Dann Huff – rhythm guitar (2), guitars (5)
 Mark Grendel – guitar solo (2), guitars (3, 4), rhythm track arrangements (4)
 Tom Hemby – guitars (6, 8, 9)
 Jimmie Lee Sloas – bass (2, 8), rhythm track arrangements (2, 4)
 Gary Lunn – fretless bass (4), bass (9)
 Paul Leim – drum overdubs (2), drums (8, 9)
 Lenny Castro – percussion (8)
 Mark Douthit – saxophone (3, 8)
 Barry Green – trombone (8)
 Mike Haynes – trumpet (8)
 Robert White Johnson – rhythm track arrangements (4)
 Pam Mark Hall – additional backing vocals (1)Production'''
 Lynn Nichols – executive producer, jacket concept 
 Brown Bannister – producer 
 Steve MacMillan – rhythm track recording (1, 2, 4-9)
 Jeff Balding – overdub recording, rhythm track recording (3)
 James "JB" Baird – overdub recording
 Joe Schiff – rhythm track recording assistant (1, 2, 4-9)
 Billy Whittington – rhythm track recording assistant (3), second engineer 
 Spencer Chrislu – second engineer 
 Danny Johnston – second engineer 
 Wade Jaynes – second engineer 
 J.T. – second engineer 
 Nick Froome – mixing 
 Ed Goodreau – mix assistant 
 Rob Jaczko – mix assistant 
 Doug Sax – mastering at The Mastering Lab (Hollywood, California)
 Joan Tankersley – art direction, jacket concept 
 Patrick Pollei – design
 Aaron Rapoport – front cover photography 
 Ellen Schuster – back cover photography

Critical reception

Evan Cater of AllMusic praised This Year's Model'' saying that "the four male vocalists donned leather jackets, laced their hair with styling gel, backed their act with all the musical technology available in the '80s, wrapped it up in shimmering space-themed art direction, and generally sent the message to church youth groups nationwide that this was not their fathers' Imperials. The ultra-sleek pop production, replete with sweeping synthesizers, gritty bass runs, and rockin' electric guitar solos, was courtesy of Brown Bannister, who brought the same big, electronic sound to other '80s CCM records like Michael W. Smith's 'The Big Picture', Amy Grant's 'Unguarded', and Charlie Peacock's 'Secret of Time.' As it turned out, 'This Year's Model' was aptly titled. The album was probably destined to be a period piece, but some of the songs, like the opening 'Holding On (First Love)' and the breakdanceable 'Fallin',' hold up surprisingly well over the years."

Charts

Year-end charts

Radio singles

References

1987 albums
The Imperials albums
Myrrh Records albums
Word Records albums